Ricardo Francisco Malerba (24 August 1905 - 29 June 1974) (nickname: Luz Demar) was a bandoneon player, composer and bandleader (tango musical genre) in Argentina during the golden age of tango.

Among outstanding compositions can be named: “Aristocracia”, “Cuando florezcan las rosas”, “Mariana” (waltzes), “Violín”, “La piba de los jazmines”, “Embrujamiento”, “Taruchito” (tangos).

References

1905 births
1974 deaths
Argentine tango musicians